Galium baldense is a plant species in the family Rubiaceae. It is endemic to the mountains of northern Italy, provinces of Lombardia, Trentino-Alto Adige, Veneto, and Friuli-Venezia Giulia.

References

baldense
Endemic flora of Italy
Flora of the Alps
Plants described in 1813